The 2002 PGA EuroPro Tour, titled as the 2002 Matchroom Sport PGA EuroPro Tour for sponsorship reasons, was the inaugural season of the PGA EuroPro Tour, one of four third-tier tours recognised by the European Tour. It was created as the merger of the EuroPro Tour and the PGA MasterCard Tour.

Schedule
The following table lists official events during the 2002 season.

Order of Merit
The Order of Merit was based on prize money won during the season, calculated in Pound sterling. The top four players on the tour (not otherwise exempt) earned status to play on the 2003 Challenge Tour.

Notes

References

PGA EuroPro Tour